The Kanzi is the trademark name of the Nicoter modern bred cultivar of domesticated apple which has been developed in Belgium by Better3Fruits and Greenstar Kanzi Europe (GKE) from a natural cross between a Gala apple and a Braeburn apple.  is Swahili for "hidden treasure".

The Kanzi apple has the same parentage as the Jazz from New Zealand and they are similar in taste and appearance. The texture of Jazz is harder. Tasters have voted for the Kanzi  in preference to the Jazz. Kanzi is still also firm and fairly crisp, quite juicy, slightly sharp rather than sweet in taste, with a mild flavor. It is mainly used for fresh consumption.

Kanzi first reached the European markets in 2006 and is also grown in the United States. A limited crop first reached the US markets in 2014.

References

External links
Nutritional facts

Apple cultivars